The Avnik mine is a large iron ore mine in Bingöl Province, eastern Turkey,  east of the capital, Ankara.

Avnik represents the largest iron reserve in Turkey having estimated reserves of 104 million tonnes of ore grading 42% iron. The 104 million tonnes of ore contains 43.7 million tonnes of iron metal.

References

External links 
 Official site

Iron mines in Turkey
Buildings and structures in Bingöl Province
Geography of Bingöl Province